The 25th Biathlon World Championships were held in 1990 for the third time in Minsk, Byelorussian SSR, Soviet Union (present-day Belarus), in Oslo, Norway and in Kontiolahti, Finland. Due to unconducive weather conditions during the season it was only possible to hold the individual competitions in Minsk. The sprints, the women's relay and team events were held in Oslo and the men's relay was finally held in Kontiolahti.

Men's results

20 km individual

10 km sprint

Team event

4 × 7.5 km relay

Women's results

15 km individual

7.5 km sprint

Team event

3 × 7.5 km relay

Medal table

References

1990
Biathlon World Championships
International sports competitions hosted by the Soviet Union
International sports competitions in Oslo
International sports competitions hosted by Finland
1990 in Soviet sport
1990 in Norwegian sport
1990 in Finnish sport
Kontiolahti
Sports competitions in Minsk
1990s in Oslo
Biathlon competitions in Finland
Biathlon competitions in Norway
Biathlon competitions in Belarus
Biathlon competitions in the Soviet Union
Holmenkollen
1990s in Minsk
1990 in Belarusian sport